Mayors of Albury, a city in southern New South Wales, Australia.

Town of Albury

City of Albury

References

3. 

Albury, New South Wales
Albury
People from Albury, New South Wales